This article displays the rosters for the participating teams at the 2004 FIBA Africa Club Championship.

Abidjan Basket Club

Source:

AS Douanes

Source:

Al Ahly

Source:

Ebun Comets

Source:

Petro Atlético

Source:
 Cristo
 F.Horácio
 Gerson
 H.Ortet
 H.Mbunga
 Kiteculo
 J.Tati
 Nascimento
 Selengue
 Belarmino
 S.Panzo
 Coach Raúl Duarte

Primeiro de Agosto

Source:

Stade Malien

Source:

References

External links
 2004 FIBA Africa Champions Cup Participating Teams

FIBA Africa Clubs Champions Cup squads
Basketball teams in Africa
FIBA